Piperton is a city in Fayette County, Tennessee, United States. The population was 2,263 at the 2020 census. In 2007 USA Today cited the National Motorist Association when it listed Piperton as one of the worst cities for speeding tickets across the USA.

Geography
Piperton is located in the southwest corner of Fayette County at  (35.045003, -89.623451). It is bordered to the west by Collierville in Shelby County, to the east by Rossville, and to the south by Marshall County, Mississippi.

Major thoroughfares
To the southeast, US 72 crosses into Mississippi and leads  to Corinth.
 State Route 57 passes through central Piperton, leading west into Collierville and east  to Grand Junction.
 State Route 196 crosses TN 57 at the center of Piperton and leads north  to Gallaway. The southern terminus of TN 196 is at US 72 just north of the Mississippi border in southern Piperton.
 State Route 385 (Nonconnah/Bill Morris Parkway), the Memphis outer beltway, passes through the western part of Piperton, with access from TN 57.
 Interstate 269 has an interchange with TN 385 at the Piperton/Collierville border. To the north of the interchange, I-269 is the new numbering for the beltway, while to the south, I-269 leads into Mississippi, with one exit in Piperton at US 72.

Demographics

2020 census

As of the 2020 United States Census, there were 2,263 people, 807 households, and 652 families residing in the city.

2000 census
At the 2000 census there were 589 people, 259 households, and 206 families in the city. The racial makeup of the city was 86.25% White, 12.56% African American, 0.51% Asian, 0.17% from other races, and 0.51% from two or more races. Hispanic or Latino of any race were 0.17%.

There were 259 households, of which 15.8% had children under the age of 18 living with them, 69.5% were married couples living together, 6.2% had a female householder with no husband present, and 20.1% were non-families. 18.1% of households were one person and 7.7% were one person aged 65 or older. The average household size was 2.27 and the average family size was 2.53.

The age distribution was 13.1% under the age of 18, 4.9% from 18 to 24, 18.8% from 25 to 44, 36.5% from 45 to 64, and 26.7% 65 or older. The median age was 53 years. For every 100 females, there were 92.5 males. For every 100 females age 18 and over, there were 91.8 males.

The median household income was $49,583 and the median family income  was $62,500. Males had a median income of $43,929 versus $32,750 for females. The per capita income for the city was $28,435. About 1.1% of families and 2.6% of the population were below the poverty line, including 8.9% of those under age 18 and 2.7% of those age 65 or over.

References

External links
 City of Piperton official website
 Piperton Fire Department
 Fayette County Chamber of Commerce

Cities in Tennessee
Cities in Fayette County, Tennessee
Memphis metropolitan area